Mazothairos (from Mazo, derived from its location of Mazon Creek and θαιρός, thairos, meaning 'hinge' in Greek) is an extinct genus of very large insect from the Carboniferous period. It was a member of the order Palaeodictyoptera. Although it is only known from very fragmentary remains from a single fossil, it is estimated to have had a wingspan of about 56 centimeters (22 in), making it one of the largest-known insects, only being rivaled in size by the largest members of the order Meganisoptera, such as Meganeura and Meganeuropsis.

It is the largest known member of the order Palaeodictyoptera, a group of insects characterized by their distinctive beak-like mouthparts, which featured elongated sharp piercing mouthparts and possibly had a sucking pump-like organ that they would have used to pierce plant tissues and drink their liquids. The group is also known for the pair of winglets on prothorax in front of the first pair of wings of its members, which gave them the epithet of "six-winged insects". Due to the fragmentary nature of the only fossil of Mazothairos, it is unknown to what extent they were present in the species.

The Holotype fossil of Mazothairos was found in the Mazon Creek fossil beds in modern-day Illinois, a lägerstatte formed approximately 309 million years ago during the Pennsylvanian epoch of the Carboniferous period. The formation was part of a river delta system and is believed to have had a tropical climate. The formation also preserved fossils of many other organisms, such as those of Illinois' state fossil Tullimonstrum.

See also 
 Palaeodictyopteroidea
 Meganeura

References 

Carboniferous insects
Prehistoric insect genera
Pennsylvanian first appearances